Bhadana is a town and union council in Gujar Khan Tehsil Punjab, Pakistan. Bhadana is also chief town of Union Council Bhadana which is an administrative subdivision of the Tehsil.

References

Populated places in Gujar Khan Tehsil
Union councils of Gujar Khan Tehsil